The Japan Mixed Doubles Curling Championship is the national curling championship for mixed doubles curling in Japan. It has been held annually since the 2007–2008 season, organized by the Japan Curling Association (JCA).

The first three championships (2007, 2008, 2009) were held in December, since then they have been held in February or March.

List of champions and medallists
Team line-ups shows in order: man, woman, coach (if exists).

Medal record for curlers

References

See also
Japan Men's/Women's Curling Championships
Japan Mixed Curling Championship
Japan Junior Curling Championships
Japan Senior Curling Championships

Curling competitions in Japan
Recurring sporting events established in 2007
2007 establishments in Japan
National curling championships
Curling
Mixed doubles curling